Petrakiella is a genus of fungi in the family Phyllachoraceae; according to the 2007 Outline of Ascomycota, the placement in this family is uncertain. This is a monotypic genus, containing the single species Petrakiella insignis.

The genus name of Petrakiella is in honour of Franz Petrak (1886–1973), who was an Austrian-Czech mycologist. 

The genus was circumscribed by Hans Sydow in Ann. Mycol. vol.22 on page 230 in 1924.

References

External links
Index Fungorum

Phyllachorales
Monotypic Sordariomycetes genera